The 1983 Reading Borough Council election was held on 5 May 1983, at the same time as other local elections across England and Wales. Following ward boundary changes, the number of seats on the council had been reduced from 49 to 45, arranged as 15 wards with three councillors each. All 45 seats on Reading Borough Council were up for election on the new boundaries.

Prior to the election the council was under no overall control, with the Conservatives the largest party, operating a minority administration with informal support from the Liberals. At the election the Conservatives won a majority on the council, taking 26 seats, whilst Labour had 13 seats, and the SDP-Liberal Alliance had 6 seats, all of whom were Liberals.

The leader of the Conservatives on the council, Deryck Morton, had held the council's top political job as chair of the policy committee since 1976, and retained that post after the election, but with his party having a majority. The leader of the council's Labour group was Mike Orton. The Liberal leader, Jim Day, lost his seat, with Basil Dunning becoming Liberal group leader after the election.

Results

Ward results
The results in each ward were as follows (an asterisk* denotes a sitting councillor standing for re-election):

Notes

References

1983 English local elections
1983